John Davis (September 16, 1851 – May 5, 1902) was a judge of the Court of Claims.

Education and career

Born on September 16, 1851, in Newton, Massachusetts, Davis attended the University of Paris in France, Heidelberg University in the German Empire, Frederick William University (now Humboldt University of Berlin) in the German Empire, then read law in 1874. He was a clerk with the United States Department of State from 1870 to 1872. He was a private secretary for United States Agent Bancroft Davis of the Joint High Commission in Geneva, Switzerland in 1872. He was a private secretary for United States Secretary of State Hamilton Fish from 1872 to 1873. He was a clerk for the Court of Commissioners of Alabama Claims in 1874. He entered private practice in New York City, New York and Washington, D.C. from 1874 to 1881. He was an assistant counsel of the United States for the French-American Claims Commission from 1881 to 1882. He was first assistant and acting secretary of state from 1882 to 1885.

Federal judicial service

Davis was nominated by President Chester A. Arthur on January 15, 1885, to a seat on the Court of Claims (later the United States Court of Claims) vacated by Judge William Adams Richardson. He was confirmed by the United States Senate on January 20, 1885, and received his commission the same day. His service terminated on May 5, 1902, due to his death in Washington, D.C.

Notable case

Davis wrote the opinion in Gray v. United States, the lead case settling claims dating from the Quasi-War between the United States and France.

Family

Davis was the grandson of John Davis, Massachusetts governor, Congressman and Senator, and nephew of Bancroft Davis, a Court of Claims judge.

References

Sources
 

1851 births
1902 deaths
Judges of the United States Court of Claims
United States Article I federal judges appointed by Chester A. Arthur
19th-century American judges
United States federal judges admitted to the practice of law by reading law